Shek Lung Tsai is a village in Sha Tin District, Hong Kong.

Administration
Shek Lung Tsai is a recognized village under the New Territories Small House Policy.

See also
 Luk Chau Shan
 Shek Lung Tsai New Village

References

Further reading

External links

 Delineation of area of existing village Shek Lung Tsai (Sha Tin) for election of resident representative (2019 to 2022)

Villages in Sha Tin District, Hong Kong